The 1981 Zheleznogorsk mid-air collision was an accident involving a Yakovlev Yak-40 jet and a Mil Mi-8T helicopter, both operated by the Russian airline Aeroflot, 11 km (6.9 miles) east of Zheleznogorsk-Ilimskiy Airport, Soviet Union, on 18 September 1981. None of the combined 40 passengers and crew on either aircraft survived.

Accident
While flight V-652 was inbound to Zheleznogorsk-Ilimskiy after its flight from Irkutsk on 18 September 1981, a Mil Mi-8T helicopter was also heading for the same airport after having finished its training flight from Bratsk. The crew of flight V-652 initiated their descent to the airport and had to pass through clouds while searching for the runway. Flight V-652 suffered immense damage to its left wing, fuselage and tail section, while the helicopter's main rotor and cockpit were destroyed with serious damage to its fuselage as well. Both aircraft nosedived towards the ground following the collision, and crashed in a wooded hilly terrain 400 meters (1,300 feet) from one another. None of the 29 passengers and 4 crew aboard flight V-652 survived the crash, and all 7 crew on board the Mil Mi-8T helicopter also perished in the disaster.

Aircraft
The Yakovlev Yak-40 involved, CCCP-87455 (msn 9431236) was built in 1974 and was used by Aeroflot from 1974 until its destruction in 1981. The Mil Mi-8T involved, CCCP-22268 (msn 6918) was also in use by Aeroflot at the time of the accident.

Aftermath
The wreckage of both aircraft were completely destroyed in the accident and post-crash fire. An investigation of the accident concluded that the cause lay with the poor surveillance conducted by ATC. The lack of communication between the three parties allowed the Mil Mi-8T helicopter to cross into the approach path of flight V-652.

References

Aeroflot accidents and incidents
Mid-air collisions involving helicopters
Mid-air collisions
Mid-air collisions involving general aviation aircraft
Aviation accidents and incidents caused by air traffic controller error
1981 in the Soviet Union
September 1981 events in Asia
Aviation accidents and incidents in 1981
Accidents and incidents involving the Yakovlev Yak-40
Accidents and incidents involving the Mil Mi-8
Aviation accidents and incidents in the Soviet Union